Todd Alan Blackledge (born February 25, 1961) is a former American football quarterback in both the NCAA and National Football League (NFL). In college, he led the Penn State Nittany Lions to a national championship. A member of the famed Class of 1983, he played for the Kansas City Chiefs and the Pittsburgh Steelers. Blackledge is currently a college football television broadcaster.

High school career
Blackledge's family moved to Princeton, New Jersey, while his father worked as offensive coordinator for the Princeton Tigers football team and Blackledge attended Princeton High School in Princeton, New Jersey, from 1975–76. He returned to the Canton area to finish his high school career at North Canton Hoover High School in North Canton, Ohio, from which he graduated in 1979.

College career
Blackledge was a three-year starter at Penn State, under Coach Joe Paterno, where he guided the Nittany Lions to a 31–5 record including a national championship in 1982. 

Following the 1982 season, Blackledge won the Davey O'Brien Award for best quarterback in the nation. As a senior, Blackledge threw for 2,218 yards with 22 touchdowns and 14 interceptions, while also rushing for three touchdowns.

Blackledge led the Nittany Lions to the national championship with a 27–23 victory over Herschel Walker-led Georgia Bulldogs in the 1983 Sugar Bowl. Blackledge was the MVP of the game, throwing for 228 yards and a 4th-quarter 47-yard touchdown to Gregg Garrity.

Professional career
Blackledge was the seventh pick and second quarterback selected in the first round of the 1983 NFL Draft, chosen by the Kansas City Chiefs. He was picked behind John Elway (#1, Baltimore) but ahead of Dan Marino (#27, Miami), astounding both Marino (who believed that he was better than Blackledge) and Blackledge himself (who had expected to be picked in the middle of the round). He was also drafted ahead of Hall of Famer Jim Kelly (#14 Buffalo), as well as Tony Eason (#15, New England) and Ken O'Brien (#22, New York Jets). He was the last quarterback drafted in the first round by the Chiefs until Patrick Mahomes three decades later. 

Blackledge was a Chief for five seasons (1983–1987) before ending his career with the Pittsburgh Steelers (1988–1989). He served mainly as a back-up to Pro-Bowl QB Bill Kenney in Kansas City. 

Blackledge was the backup to Bubby Brister in Pittsburgh his final two seasons, going 2-3 in games started due to Brister's injury.

Overall, Blackledge was 15-14 as a starter in the NFL, throwing for 5,286 yards with 29 touchdowns and 38 interceptions.

Broadcasting career
Blackledge went on to host radio sports talk shows in Cleveland (WKNR) and Canton, Ohio (WHBC). He also did analyst work for the Big East Network, Indianapolis Colts preseason games, and ESPN.

From 1994–1998, he worked as a college football analyst for ABC Sports. In 1999, Blackledge joined CBS Sports as the lead analyst for the network's college football coverage. On September 10, 2000, he called the Oakland Raiders and Indianapolis Colts game with Greg Gumbel as he filled in for Phil Simms who underwent an emergency appendectomy. In 2006, he began serving on the first team alongside Mike Patrick for ESPN College Football Saturday Primetime on ESPN. As part of his duties he is featured on "Todd's Taste of the Town", a segment where he visits a local restaurant and samples its fare. Blackledge has facetiously stated this is the most difficult part of his broadcasting experience. 

Blackedge was teamed with Brad Nessler and sideline reporter Erin Andrews for the 2009 season, while Patrick was teamed with Craig James and sideline reporter Heather Cox.

In the early 2020s, Blackledge was paired with Sean McDonough, who returned to calling games at the college level after spending two seasons with Monday Night Football, and Holly Rowe, whom he has teamed with over the previous three years.

For the 2023 season, NBC Sports signed Blackledge as the color analyst on the new Big Ten Saturday Night package, partnering with Noah Eagle.

Coaching career
In April 2014, Blackledge was hired as the head varsity basketball coach at Hoover High School in North Canton, Ohio.

Personal life
Blackledge is the son of Ron, a former NFL assistant coach.

Blackledge earned a Bachelor of Arts in speech communication from Penn State in 1983, graduating Phi Beta Kappa with a 3.8 grade point average. Named a first-team Academic All-American, he was also awarded the Eric Walker Award, given to the Penn State senior student who has most "enhanced the esteem and recognition of the University." Blackledge was inducted into the Academic All-America Hall of Fame in 1997. He sits on the Board of Visitors for Penn State's Center for Sports Journalism.

Blackledge was selected to receive the prestigious 2008 NCAA Silver Anniversary Award, recognizing former student-athletes who excelled both in their collegiate and professional careers. On June 5, 2009, Blackledge received Penn State's prestigious Distinguished Alumni Award.

References

External links

1961 births
Living people
American sports radio personalities
American football quarterbacks
College football announcers
ESPN people
Kansas City Chiefs players
National Football League announcers
Penn State Nittany Lions football players
People from Princeton, New Jersey
Pittsburgh Steelers players
Players of American football from Canton, Ohio
Princeton High School (New Jersey) alumni